The Javary River, Javari River or Yavarí River is a  tributary of the Amazon that forms the boundary between Brazil and Peru for more than .

The Brazilian Boundary Commission ascended it in 1866 to the junction of the Shino with its Jaquirana branch. The country it traverses in its extremely sinuous course is very level, similar in character to that of the Juruá.

There are a number of small private reserves along the river, which arrange wildlife viewing.

The town of Benjamin Constant lies at the mouth of the river, on the Brazilian bank.

References

Tributaries of the Amazon River
Rivers of Peru
Rivers of Acre (state)
Rivers of Amazonas (Brazilian state)
Brazil–Peru border
International rivers of South America
Rivers of Ucayali Region